Encephalartos barteri is a species of cycad that is native to Benin, Ghana, Nigeria, and Togo.

Description
It is a dioecious species, endowed with spindle-shaped, sessile, yellow-colored male cones, 8–23 cm long and with a diameter of 3–5 cm, with broad, rhombic-shaped microsporophylls, and feminine, ovoid-colored cones green, 15–35 cm long and 8–15 cm in diameter, with macrosporophylls with a warty surface.

The seeds have an oblong shape, are 20–30 mm long, have a width of 18–23 mm and are covered by a red sarcotesta

Range
Encephalartos barteri occurs:
near Tokkos, Plateau State, central Nigeria (Encephalartos barteri ssp. allochrous)
between Jebba and Ilorin in Nigeria
Borgou Department and near Savalou in Benin
Volta River watershed, Ghana
Togo

References

External links
 
 

barteri
Flora of Benin
Flora of Ghana
Flora of Nigeria
Flora of Togo
Vulnerable flora of Africa
Plants described in 1917